Mado Lamotte is the stage name of Luc Provost, a Canadian drag queen, author, singer and gay community personality, most noted as the owner of the Cabaret Mado drag club in Montreal, Quebec.

Career
Provost, who studied theatre at the Université du Québec à Montréal, began his drag performance career in 1987. As Mado Lamotte she was MC and DJ of Ciel Mon Mardi at Sky in the 1990s, before opening her own drag cabaret, Cabaret Mado, in Montreal's Gay Village in 2002. She was also for many years the organizer and host of Mascara, the annual drag stage show at Divers/Cité.

Lamotte is also an author, who has written a weekly column for the defunct Ici weekly newspaper and a monthly article for the Fugues gay and lesbian newsmagazine. In 2000, she published a collection of her columns entitled Tu vois ben qu'est folle ("She's obviously crazy").

She released a single, "Le Rap à Minifée", in 1996, and a full-length album, Full Mado - Le Remix Album, in 2010. She has made cameo appearances in the films Saved by the Belles and Cadavre Exquis premiere edition, and starred in the 2007 play Saving Céline, in which she (credited as Mado Lamotte, not Luc Provost) portrayed a drag queen obsessed by Céline Dion who becomes embroiled in a murder plot against the singer.

On August 12, 2017, as a part of Fierté Montréal Canada, Mado celebrated her 30th anniversary as a performer with a free show at the Parc des faubourgs in Montréal. In the same year she was the host of Ils de jour, elles de nuit, an Ici ARTV television documentary series about drag queens which profiled Rita Baga, Barbada de Barbades, Gaby, Lady Boom Boom, Lady Pounana and Tracy Trash.

In 2018 Provost opened La Dinette chez Mado, a diner-style restaurant adjacent to Cabaret Mado.

In popular culture

In August 2022, Lady Boom Boom selected Mado as her Snatch Game character impersonation in the third season of Canada's Drag Race. She ended up in the bottom two, and was eliminated after a lip sync against fellow contestant Kimmy Couture. Fellow contestant and Montreal-based drag colleague Gisèle Lullaby had also intended to play Mado, but later ceded the character to Boom Boom on the grounds that she had a backup character while Boom Boom did not.

Discography 
 1996: Le Rap à Minifée (CD single)
 2010: Full Mado: Le Remix Album

Filmography 
 2003: Saved by the Belles
 2006: Cadavre Exquis premiere edition
 2007: La Reine Mado

References

External links
Le Monde de Mado (Official website) 

20th-century Canadian comedians
20th-century Canadian male singers
20th-century Canadian male writers
21st-century Canadian comedians
21st-century Canadian male writers
Comedians from Montreal
Canadian columnists
Canadian drag queens
Canadian television hosts
French-language singers of Canada
Year of birth missing (living people)
Living people
French Quebecers
LGBT culture in Montreal
Université du Québec à Montréal alumni
21st-century Canadian male singers
21st-century Canadian LGBT people
20th-century Canadian LGBT people